Paestum is a frazione of the comune (municipality) of Capaccio in the Cilento area of southern Italy. It lies in the province of Salerno which is part of the region of Campania. It is situated on the Tyrrhenian coast and is notable for the famous ruins of the  ancient city of the same name nearby.

Overview
Paestum can be reached by the road linking Agropoli to Battipaglia. The village also has a railway station on the Naples-Salerno-Reggio Calabria railway line. The nearest airport is Salerno-Pontecagnano (QSR), 30 km from Paestum.

References

External links

Frazioni of the Province of Salerno
Localities of Cilento

it:Paestum